Rana Gurjeet Singh (born 19 April 1952) is current MLA of Punjab from Kapurthala Assembly constituency. He represented the Jalandhar Lok Sabha constituency of Punjab from 2004 to 2009 and is a member of the Indian National Congress (INC) political party. Rana Gurjeet Singh migrated to Punjab in the year 1986 and set up a kraft-based paper mill in dist. Ropar. He later went on to set up a sugar mill in Buttar Sivia village of Amritsar district and various other industries.

He has built a political career for himself when he won his first M.L.A. election in Kapurthala, Punjab. He has since been elected as a M.P. from Jalandhar and has won the Kapurthala MLA seat numerous times. He represents the constituency of Kapurthala today as an MLA and is an ex-Minister in the Punjab cabinet.

On 25 December 2016, a criminal complaint against Singh was filed for an alleged assault against Kulwinder Singh Babbal, Bholath Assembly constituency in the Punjab Legislative Assembly election. However, Ranjit Singh Rana went to become INC candidate from Bholath. Later, Rana Gurjeet Singh claimed on 29 December that the complaint was filed on behalf of a Shiromani Akali Dal leader. Accused of pocketing sand mine contracts worth crores on his staff's names, Punjab Power & Irrigation Minister Rana Gurjit Singh has finally resigned in January 2018.

MLA
The Aam Aadmi Party gained a strong 79% majority in the sixteenth Punjab Legislative Assembly by winning 92 out of 117 seats in the 2022 Punjab Legislative Assembly election. MP Bhagwant Mann was sworn in as Chief Minister on 16 March 2022.

Electoral performance

References

External links
 Members of Fourteenth Lok Sabha - Parliament of India website

India MPs 2004–2009
1956 births
Indian National Congress politicians
Living people
People from Jalandhar
People from Patiala
People from Udham Singh Nagar district
Lok Sabha members from Punjab, India
Punjab, India MLAs 2012–2017
Punjab, India MLAs 2017–2022
Punjab, India MLAs 2022–2027
Indian National Congress politicians from Punjab, India